The following is a list of competitors who have managed to reach at least the second stage in each competition of Sasuke and also number of competitors who failed to finish the first stage. The results are listed according to who went furthest, along with the obstacle and stage they failed to complete. In the 10th competition, the number system ran from 901–1000 to indicate that 1000 attempts have been made to complete the first stage; in the 20th competition, it ran from 1901–2000 to indicate that 2000 attempts have been made to complete the first stage. In the 30th competition, it ran from 2901–3000 to indicate that 3000 attempts have been made to complete the first stage; then in the 40th competition, it ran from 3901-4000 to indicate that 4000 attempts have been made to complete the first stage.

Legend
 The competitor achieved Total Victory. The competitor is female. The competitor was injured while performing the obstacle.   The competitor was disqualified.

1st competition
Aired: September 27, 1997 †

† First and only competition to be held indoors at Tokyo Bay NK Hall.

2nd competition
Aired: September 26, 1998

† Ebihara pushed one side of the pipe harder than the other, causing the pipe to fall off the tracks.

3rd competition
Aired: March 13, 1999

4th competition
Aired: October 16, 1999

† When Schroeder tried to get the pipe across the tracks, he pushed one side harder than the other, causing it to fall off the tracks.

5th competition
Aired: March 18, 2000

6th competition
Aired: September 9, 2000

† Yamada cleared the Pipe Slider, but after the landing he fell sideways off the mat.

Note: All five competitors who cleared the First Stage also cleared the Second Stage.

7th competition
Aired: March 17, 2001

† Yamamoto climbed two and a half meters before slipping and dislocating his shoulder, falling to the safety mats below.

8th competition
Aired: September 29, 2001

† Jovtchev fell off the Spider Climb after the walls split at the 15 second limit.
†† Sakawa landed on the mat from the Chain Reaction, but as he landed, his foot touched the water, resulting in immediate disqualification.
††† Shoei went off course as he touched the Body Prop's board.

9th competition
Aired: March 16, 2002

† When Naoki Iketani cleared the Reverse Conveyor, time was expired before he could attempt the Wall Lifting.

10th competition
Aired: September 25, 2002

11th competition
Aired: March 21, 2003

† Nakayama cleared the Wall Lift, but hit the red button a split-second too late.

12th competition
Aired: October 1, 2003

† Yamada cleared the second stage, but was disqualified for using his gloves on the Spider Walk.

13th competition
Aired: April 6, 2004

14th competition
Aired: January 4, 2005

† At the end of the Devil's Swing Kobayashi tried to grab the bar of the Pipe Slider, but he missed and the bar moved too far away from him. Although he continued to swing, he was unable to get through that gap and he fell.
†† Hamm cleared the Wall Lift as time ran out, but forgot to hit the red button as he burst through the gates, and was disqualified.

15th competition
Aired: July 20, 2005

† Bunpei Shiratori was the last competitor to attempt the first stage due to suffering from heat exhaustion.

16th competition
Aired: December 30, 2005

† When Nagano tried to grab the Pipe Slider bar from the Devil's Swing, he lost his grip on the bar and it slid far away from him. Thus, he was unable to reach the Pipe Slider when he jumped for it and he fell into the water.

17th competition
Aired: October 11, 2006

18th competition
Aired: March 21, 2007

† When Nagano crossed the second gap of the Cliff Hanger, he grabbed the top of the frame with one hand, therefore going off the course. Nagano pointed out his mistake and allowed himself to be disqualified.
†† No number given. Some sources have said he was No. 86, but this has not been proven to be true.

19th competition
Aired: September 19, 2007

Note: Only 2 competitors managed to clear the First Stage and neither managed to clear the Second Stage.

20th competition
Aired: March 26, 2008

21st competition
Aired: September 17, 2008

†An error in design caused the ring to force down the track, causing Nagano to fail just as he managed to put the ring in the stopper.

22nd competition
Aired: March 30, 2009

† When Kanno climbed the Spider Flip, he touched part of the frame with his foot and climbed along the side of the actual platform, therefore going off the course.

23rd competition
Aired: September 27, 2009

† Nagano was given a second run of the first stage because the Slider Jump failed to work properly.
†† While on the Arm Rings, Yamamoto's shoulder dislocated again, so he immediately dropped into the water.
††† Nakamura was disqualified for using his foot to touch the frame of Salmon Ladder.

24th competition
Aired: January 1, 2010

^ Kenji twisted up the G-Rope and got the safety wire tangled, causing him to stop.

25th competition
Aired: March 28, 2010

† Urushihara touched the water with his foot.

26th competition
Aired: January 2, 2011

27th Competition
Aired: October 3, 2011

† Kanno withdrew before Double Salmon Ladder because of a shoulder injury.

28th Competition
Aired: December 27, 2012

29th Competition
Aired: June 27, 2013

† Takami was disqualified for not landing properly on the fourth set of rungs.

30th Competition
Aired: July 3, 2014

† Morisawa cleared the First Stage but withdrew before the Second Stage due to tweaking his neck.

31st Competition
Aired: July 1, 2015

† Failed the transition onto the Salmon Ladder Kudari

32nd Competition

Aired: July 3, 2016

† The Ultra Crazy Cliffhanger was tied with the Vertical Limit Kai which Drew fell almost immediately after making the transition. First time since SASUKE 9 a Cliffhanger variant is beaten on its introductory tournament.

Note: All 8 competitors who cleared the First Stage also cleared the Second Stage.

33rd Competition

Aired: March 26, 2017

34th Competition

Aired: October 8, 2017.

35th Competition

Aired: March 26, 2018

36th Competition

Aired: December 31, 2018

† Wataru used his legs on the side of the Reverse Conveyor.
†† Drew slipped off course when sliding down the chute from the Backstream

37th Competition

Aired: December 31, 2019

38th Competition 
Aired : December 29, 2020

39th Competition
Aired: December 28, 2021

† When making the first transition, Yoshinori grabbed the frame of the obstacle and went out of bounds.

40th Competition
Airdate: December 27, 2022

References

Sasuke (TV series)